Pamela Reaves-Harris is an Illinois lawyer and Democratic politician. A former administrative law judge, she defeated Derrick Smith in the Democratic primary in 2014, and then won election to the Illinois House of Representatives to represent the 10th district. She won a five way Democratic primary that included former State Representative Eddie Winters. However, Reaves-Harris chose not to seek re-election in 2016. She was succeeded by Melissa Conyears.

References

External links
Representative Pamela Reaves-Harris (D) - Illinois General Assembly

Living people
Democratic Party members of the Illinois House of Representatives
Politicians from Chicago
Women state legislators in Illinois
Year of birth missing (living people)
21st-century American politicians
21st-century American women politicians